The Television Academy Hall of Fame honors individuals who have made extraordinary contributions to U.S. television. The hall of fame was founded by former Academy of Television Arts & Sciences (ATAS) president John H. Mitchell (1921–1988). Inductions are not held every year.

Synopsis 
The awards were inaugurated in 1984, in the words of the selection committee, the Hall of Fame is for "persons who have made outstanding contributions in the arts, sciences or management of television, based upon either cumulative contributions and achievements or a singular contribution or achievement." Mitchell remained the chair of the Hall of Fame until his death in January 1988. He was succeeded by Edgar Scherick, who in turn passed the reins to Norman Lear.

The first ceremony in 1984 celebrated the careers of Lucille Ball, Milton Berle, Paddy Chayefsky, Norman Lear, Edward R. Murrow, William S. Paley and David Sarnoff. The honorees received glass statuettes in the form of two ballet dancers that were created by sculptor and painter Pascal to reflect the self-discipline required in all facets of the arts. Since 1988, inductees have brought home an award in the form of a crystal television screen atop a cast-bronze base. The new awards were designed by art director Romain Johnston.

Inductions are not held every year. Five or more inductees are usually announced at a time. All inductees have been individuals or pairs, with the exceptions of the series I Love Lucy in 1990 and the entire original Saturday Night Live cast in 2017.

In 2016, the four broadcast networks (ABC, CBS, FOX and NBC) were honored with special "Hall of Fame Cornerstone" Awards.

Bill Cosby was inducted in 1991, but following his 2018 conviction of rape, he has since been removed.

Hall of Fame inductees 
 1st induction (1984)
Lucille Ball
Milton Berle 
Paddy Chayefsky
Norman Lear 
Edward R. Murrow
William S. Paley 
David Sarnoff

 2nd induction (1985)
Carol Burnett
Sid Caesar
Walter Cronkite 
Joyce Hall
Rod Serling
Ed Sullivan
Sylvester "Pat" Weaver

 3rd induction (1986)
Steve Allen
Fred Coe
Walt Disney
Jackie Gleason
Mary Tyler Moore
Frank Stanton
Burr Tillstrom

 4th induction (1987)
Johnny Carson
Jacques Cousteau
Leonard Goldenson
Jim Henson
Bob Hope
Ernie Kovacs
Eric Sevareid

 5th induction (1988)
Jack Benny
George Burns and Gracie Allen
Chet Huntley and David Brinkley
Red Skelton
David Susskind
David L. Wolper

 6th induction (1989)
Roone Arledge
Fred Astaire
Perry Como 
Joan Ganz Cooney
Don Hewitt
Carroll O'Connor
Barbara Walters

 7th induction (1990)
Desi Arnaz
Leonard Bernstein
James Garner
I Love Lucy
Danny Thomas
Mike Wallace

 8th induction (1991)
Bill Cosby (revoked following his 2018 conviction of rape).
Andy Griffith
Ted Koppel
Sheldon Leonard
Dinah Shore
Ted Turner

 9th induction (1992)
John Chancellor
Dick Clark
Phil Donahue
Mark Goodson
Bob Newhart
Agnes Nixon
Jack Webb

 10th induction (1993)
Alan Alda
Howard Cosell
Barry Diller 
Fred W. Friendly
William Hanna and Joseph Barbera
Oprah Winfrey

 11th induction (1995)
Michael Landon
Richard Levinson and William Link
Jim McKay
Bill Moyers
Dick Van Dyke
Betty White

 12th induction (1996)
Edward Asner
Steven Bochco
Marcy Carsey and Tom Werner
Charles Kuralt
Angela Lansbury
Aaron Spelling
Lew Wasserman

 13th induction (1997)
James L. Brooks
Garry Marshall
Quinn Martin
Diane Sawyer
Grant Tinker

 14th induction (1999)
Herbert Brodkin
Robert MacNeil and Jim Lehrer
Lorne Michaels
Carl Reiner
Fred Rogers
Fred Silverman
Ethel Winant

 15th induction (2002)
Tim Conway and Harvey Korman
John Frankenheimer 
Bob Mackie
Jean Stapleton
Bud Yorkin

 16th induction (2004)
Bob Barker
Charles Cappleman, executive
Art Carney
Katie Couric
Dan Rather
Brandon Tartikoff

 17th induction (2006)
Tom Brokaw
James Burrows
Leonard Goldberg
Regis Philbin
William Shatner

 18th induction (2008)
Bea Arthur
Daniel Burke
Larry Gelbart
Merv Griffin
Thomas Murphy
Sherwood Schwartz

 19th induction (2010)
Candice Bergen
Charles Lisanby
Don Pardo
Gene Roddenberry
Smothers Brothers
Bob Stewart

 20th induction (2011)
Diahann Carroll
Tom Freston
Earle Hagen
Susan Harris
Peter Jennings
Cloris Leachman
Bill Todman

 21st induction (2012)
Mary-Ellis Bunim and Jonathan Murray
Michael Eisner
Sherman Hemsley
Bill Klages
Mario Kreutzberger
Chuck Lorre
Vivian Vance and William Frawley

 22nd induction (2013)
Philo Farnsworth
Ron Howard
Al Michaels
Leslie Moonves
Bob Schieffer
Dick Wolf

 23rd induction (2014)
Ray Dolby
David E. Kelley
Jay Leno
Julia Louis-Dreyfus
Rupert Murdoch
Brandon Stoddard

 Cornerstone Award (2016)
ABC
CBS
FOX
NBC

 24th induction (2017)
Original Saturday Night Live cast: Dan Aykroyd, John Belushi, Chevy Chase, Jane Curtin, Garrett Morris, Laraine Newman and Gilda Radner
Roy Christopher
Shonda Rhimes
Joan Rivers
John Wells

 25th induction (2020)
Bob Iger
Geraldine Laybourne
Seth MacFarlane
Jay Sandrich
Cicely Tyson

 26th induction (2022)
Debbie Allen
Ken Burns
Bob Daly
Robert L. Johnson
Rita Moreno
Donald A. Morgan, ASC

See also
NAB Broadcasting Hall of Fame

References

External links
Official site
Hall of Fame Honorees: Complete List

Television organizations in the United States
Halls of fame in California
Media museums in California
Mass media museums in the United States
Awards established in 1984
Academy of Television Arts & Sciences